"i" is the second album by A.R. Kane, released in 1989 on One Little Indian. The album engaged more overtly with pop, dance and electronic styles following the group's debut Sixty Nine. Like its predecessor, "i" was released to moderate sales figures and topped the UK independent charts.

Reviews

In a mixed 1990 review, critic Greg Tate stated that the album "seems both more rudimentary and more calculating by comparison with the organic and uncontrived otherness of 69," noting their incorporation of "various received rock, reggae, and house song-forms" and opining that "the results are spotty." The AllMusic review by Jason Ankeny called the album "breathtaking in its scope and positively epic in its ambition," and concluded that, "largely overlooked upon its original release, i is still an underappreciated masterpiece."

Track listing

Personnel 

A.R. Kane – arranger, audio production, engineer, guitar, multi instruments, producer, string arrangements, vocals
Gini Ball, Sally Herbert, Jeremy Metcalfe – violin
Benny Di Massa – drums
Colin Cairns – bass
Sue Dench, Jocelyn Pook – viola
John Dent – cut, cutting engineer
The False Harmonies – strings
Lincoln Fong, Gerard Johnson, Paul Kendall, Nigel Kennedy, Gail Lambourne, Mick Roasty, Sam Smith, Ken Thomas, Jeff Ward – engineer
Girl, Lorna – vocals
Bonjo Iyabinghi Noah – percussion
Art Kane – arranger, engineer, instrumentation, producer, string arrangements
Maggie Tambala – bass, vocals
Martin McCarrick, Audrey Riley – cello
Billy McGee – string arrangements
Ray Shulman – bass, producer
Chris Tombling – balloon, violin
Halpin Grey Vermeir – cover design, design

References

1989 albums
A.R. Kane albums
One Little Independent Records albums